Roberto D. Merlin is an Argentine physicist and Peter A. Franken Collegiate Professor of Physics and Professor of Electrical Engineering and Computer Science at the University of Michigan.  He is known, among other things, for his work on quasiperiodic superlattices, squeezed phonons, and, most recently, for the discovery of "superfocusing", a method for creating lenses that can surpass the diffraction limit without using negative refraction materials.

Roberto Merlin was born in Buenos Aires, Argentina. He received his master's degree from the University of Buenos Aires in 1973 and his doctorate from the University of Stuttgart in 1978. His graduate advisor was Professor Manuel Cardona. After a postdoctoral position in the group of Professor Miles V. Klein at the University of Illinois at Urbana-Champaign, he joined the Physics faculty of the University of Michigan in 1980.

In 1985 he was promoted to associate professor, and then professor in 1989. From 1993 to 1996, Merlin served as Associate Chair for Research and Facilities of the Department of Physics. In 2000, he received a joint appointment to the Department of Electrical Engineering and Computer Science. He is now the director of the Optical Physics Interdisciplinary Laboratory.

Merlin is a fellow of the American Physical Society, the Optical Society of America, the von Humboldt Foundation, and the John Simon Guggenheim Memorial Foundation. In 2006 he received the Frank Isakson Prize for Optical Effects in Solids from the American Physical Society.

Merlin does a variety of interdisciplinary work, mostly related to condensed matter physics. He has done research on Raman spectroscopy, rare-earth magnet semiconductors, superconductors, superlattices, ultrafast lasers, intercalated graphite, and negative refraction.

Selected publications

External links
 New superlens could run rings around the rest, New Scientist, July 12, 2007
 Simple 'superlens' sharpens focusing power, New Scientist, April 24, 2008

References 

Argentine physicists
University of Michigan faculty
Living people
Year of birth missing (living people)
Rare earth scientists